Annegret "Anne" Dietrich (born 14 August 1980) is a German-born Swiss bobsledder who has competed since 2001. She won two medals at the FIBT World Championships with a gold for Germany (Two-woman: 2003) and a silver for Switzerland (Mixed team: 2009).

Dietrich competed for the Germans until the 2007-08 season and competed with the Swiss since the 2008-09 season.

References
 Bobsleigh two-woman world championship medalists since 2000
 (FIBT profile for Germany, as Anne Dietrich) http://www.fibt.com/index.php?id=47&L=0&tx_bzdstaffdirectory_pi1%5BshowUid%5D=100217&tx_bzdstaffdirectory_pi1%5BbackPid%5D=93
 (FIBT profile for Switzerland, as Anne Dietrich) http://www.fibt.com/index.php?id=47&tx_bzdstaffdirectory_pi1%5BshowUid%5D=101191&tx_bzdstaffdirectory_pi1%5BbackPid%5D=63&L=0

1980 births
German female bobsledders
Living people
Swiss female bobsledders
21st-century Swiss women
21st-century German women